Josy Stoffel (27 June 1928 – 9 March 2021) was a Luxembourgish gymnast. He was born in Differdange. He participated in five consecutive editions of the Summer Olympic Games (1948, 1952, 1956, 1960, 1964), but never won a medal.  Nonetheless, Stoffel dominated the domestic scene, and won Luxembourg's national gymnastics championships for sixteen straight years, from 1949 until 1964. In 2008 he was promoted to the rank of Chevalier in the Order of Merit of the Grand Duchy of Luxembourg.

Footnotes

External links

1928 births
2021 deaths
Luxembourgian male artistic gymnasts
Olympic gymnasts of Luxembourg
Gymnasts at the 1948 Summer Olympics
Gymnasts at the 1952 Summer Olympics
Gymnasts at the 1956 Summer Olympics
Gymnasts at the 1960 Summer Olympics
Gymnasts at the 1964 Summer Olympics
People from Differdange
Knights of the Order of Merit of the Grand Duchy of Luxembourg